Princess Veronica is the only album released by The Saddle Club cast member Heli Simpson. The album includes Simpson's debut single, "Don't Ask Me". Prior to releasing the album, Simpson released the single "Don't Ask Me". After Princess Veronica, Simpson released the related EP Princess Veronica Tour EP. The album charted at number 75 on the ARIA Albums Chart, spending one week on the chart.

Track listing
 "The Way You Are"
 "Don't Ask Me"
 "I Want You to Know"
 "Princess Veronica"
 "A Girl Like Me"
 "She"
 "Sister to Me"
 "All I Want"
 "Can You Read the Sign?"
 "No One Like You"
 "Daddy's Little Girl"
 "Holding Onto You"
 "Crazy"
 "There's Always Room for Love"
 "Money Can't Buy" (bonus track)

Charts

Release history

References

2004 debut albums
Heli Simpson albums